Kork can refer to:

Places
Kork, Germany, a district of Kehl, Germany
Kork, Kerman, a village in Kerman Province, Iran

People
Andres Kork (born 1950), Estonian surgeon and politician
Jüri Kork (born 1947), Estonian politician
Toomas Kork (born 1945), Estonian businessman and politician

See also
Cork (disambiguation)
KORK (disambiguation)

Estonian-language surnames